The 2012 Porsche Tennis Grand Prix was a women's tennis tournament played on indoor clay courts. It was the 35th edition of the Porsche Tennis Grand Prix, and was part of the Premier tournaments of the 2012 WTA Tour. It took place at the Porsche Arena in Stuttgart, Germany, from 23 April until 29 April 2012. Second-seeded Maria Sharapova won the singles title.

Singles main draw entrants

Seeds

 1 Rankings are as of April 16, 2012

Other entrants
The following players received wildcards into the main draw:
  Kristina Barrois
  Mona Barthel

The following players received entry from the qualifying draw:
  Gréta Arn
  Iveta Benešová
  Anna Chakvetadze
  Alizé Cornet

The following players received entry as lucky loser:
  Akgul Amanmuradova
  Kateryna Bondarenko

Withdrawals
  Daniela Hantuchová
  Sabine Lisicki
  Flavia Pennetta (wrist injury)
  Vera Zvonareva

Retirements
  Alizé Cornet (right shoulder injury)
  Jelena Janković (low back injury)
  Andrea Petkovic (right ankle injury)

Doubles main draw entrants

Seeds

1 Rankings are as of April 16, 2012

Other entrants
The following pairs received wildcards into the doubles main draw:
  Mona Barthel /  Tatjana Malek
  Angelique Kerber /  Andrea Petkovic
  Francesca Schiavone /  Roberta Vinci
The following pair received entry as alternates:
  Chan Hao-ching /  Rika Fujiwara

Withdrawals
  Flavia Pennetta (wrist injury)

Retirements
  Paola Suárez (low back injury)

Finals

Singles

 Maria Sharapova deeated.  Victoria Azarenka,  6–1, 6–4
 It was Sharapova's 1st title of the year and 25th of her career.

Doubles

 Iveta Benešová /  Barbora Záhlavová-Strýcová defeated.  Julia Görges /  Anna-Lena Grönefeld, 6–4, 7–5

References

External links
Official website

Porsche Tennis Grand Prix
Porsche Tennis Grand Prix
2012 in German tennis
2010s in Baden-Württemberg
Porsch